KB Hallen station is an S-train station in Copenhagen, Denmark, served by the ring line.

See also
 List of railway stations in Denmark

S-train (Copenhagen) stations
Railway stations opened in 2005
Railway stations in Denmark opened in the 21st century